Betsi DeVries was a Democratic member of the New Hampshire Senate, representing the 18th district from 2006 until 2010. Previously she was a member of the New Hampshire House of Representatives from 2004 through 2006. She lost her re-election bid in November 2010.

She served as Chair of the New Hampshire Senate Public and Municipal Affairs Committee, is the Vice Chair of the Commerce, Labor and Consumer Protection Committee, and served on the Executive Departments and Administration Committee.

The Senate District 18 comprises: Litchfield and Wards 5, 6, 7, 8 and 9 in the city of Manchester.

In addition to her elected positions Senator DeVries also serves on the board of directors of the Heritage United Way, and the Manchester YWCA. She is past president of the Manchester Area League of Women Voters, a member of the Crystal Lake Preservation Association and a member of the Pine Island Pond Environmental Society.

External links
The New Hampshire Senate - Senator Betsi DeVries official NH Senate website
Project Vote Smart - Senator Betsi L. DeVries (NH) profile
Follow the Money - Betsi DeVries
2006 2004 campaign contributions
New Hampshire Senate Democratic Caucus - Betsi DeVries profile

Democratic Party New Hampshire state senators
Democratic Party members of the New Hampshire House of Representatives
Living people
Women state legislators in New Hampshire
1955 births
21st-century American women